The Happy Valley Racecourse is one of the two racecourses for horse racing and is a tourist attraction in Hong Kong. It is located in Happy Valley on Hong Kong Island, surrounded by Wong Nai Chung Road and Morrison Hill Road. The capacity of the venue is 55,000.

History

It was first built in 1845 to provide horse racing for the British people in Hong Kong. The area was previously swampland, but the only flat ground suitable for horse racing on Hong Kong Island. To make way for the racecourse, Hong Kong Government prohibited rice growing by villages in the surrounding area. The first race ran in December 1846. Over the years, horse racing became more and more popular among the Chinese residents.

On 26 February 1918, a temporary grandstand collapsed, knocking over hot food stalls that set bamboo matting ablaze. In the fire that ensued at least 590 people died.

Over the years, facilities have been added and extended, including extensively in 1995.

Facilities
The Happy Valley Racecourse is one of two racecourses in Hong Kong used by the Hong Kong Jockey Club for horse racing meets, the other being the Sha Tin Racecourse. Races in Happy Valley usually take place on Wednesday nights and are open to the public as well as members of the Club. The Happy Valley Racecourse and its seven-storey stands are capable of accommodating approximately 55,000 spectators.

The inner field of the course contains sports and leisure facilities such as football, hockey and rugby fields, managed by the Leisure and Cultural Services Department.

The Hong Kong Jockey Club Archive and Museum
The Hong Kong Jockey Club Archive and Museum (or Hong Kong Racing Museum) was set up in 1995 and opened on 18 October 1996. It is now located on the second floor of the Happy Valley Stand of the racecourse.

There are four galleries in the museum:
 The Origin of Our Horses: Shows the migration route horses travelled in the early days from the northern part of China to Hong Kong.
 Shaping Sha Tin: Exhibits the history of construction of Sha Tin Racecourse.
 Understanding Horses: Exhibits the skeleton of the three-time Hong Kong Champion Silver Lining.
 Thematic Exhibitions: The history of the Jockey Club is exhibited. Selected charitable organisations and community projects supported by The Hong Kong Jockey Club Charities Trust are also displayed in this gallery.

There is also a cinema and a souvenir shop in the museum.

See also
Hong Kong Tourism Board

References

External links

Hong Kong Jockey Club
Hong Kong Racing Museum

Happy Valley, Hong Kong
Horse racing venues in Hong Kong
Landmarks in Hong Kong
Tourist attractions in Hong Kong
Sports venues completed in 1845
1845 establishments in Hong Kong